Ady Setiawan (born 10 September 1994), is an Indonesian professional footballer who plays for Liga 1 club RANS Nusantara. A versatile player, Can has also played as a right-back, defensive midfielder and centre-back.

Club career

Martapura FC
Setiawan started his professional career in 2015 with Liga 2 club Martapura, which was renamed in 2021 to Dewa United after an acquisition. At Martapura, which was based in South Kalimantan province, Setiawan played in 42 matches and scored 12 goals.

Barito Putera
Setiawan in 2018 signed a one-year contract with Liga 1 club Barito Putera, which is based in the same province as Martapura. Setiawan scored three goals in 35 matches in the 2018 Liga 1 season.

Persela Lamongan
Setiawan in 2020 moved to Persela Lamongan for the 2020 Liga 1 season that only lasted for three matches. Cash-strapped Persela failed to extend his contract after one year.

Persebaya Surabaya
Setiawan only became known nationally after he signed a contract in 2021 with Liga 1 club Persebaya Surabaya and participated in the 2021 Menpora Cup, the prelude to the 2021 Liga 1 season. His no-nonsense determination as a defensive midfielder earned him a call to train with the Indonesian national football team for the first time in his career.

RANS Nusantara
Ady was signed for RANS Nusantara to play in Liga 1 in the 2022–23 season. He made his league debut on 23 July 2022 in a match against PSIS Semarang at the Jatidiri Stadium, Semarang.

International career 
He earned his first cap in a 25 May 2021 friendly match in Dubai against Afghanistan, which was a warm-up ahead of the 2022 FIFA World Cup qualification matches in the United Arab Emirates.

Career statistics

Club

References

External links
 Ady Setiawan at Soccerway
 

1995 births
Living people
Indonesian footballers
Association football defenders
Liga 1 (Indonesia) players
Liga 2 (Indonesia) players
Dewa United F.C. players
PS Barito Putera players
Persela Lamongan players
Persebaya Surabaya players
RANS Nusantara F.C. players
People from Bima Regency
Sportspeople from West Nusa Tenggara